Karoline Staalesen Larsen better known as Emila is a Norwegian singer.

Discography

Singles
featured in

References

Norwegian women singers
Living people
Year of birth missing (living people)